Talkin' 'Bout Your Generation is an Australian game show produced by Granada Productions which premiered on Network Ten on 5 May 2009. It is hosted by Shaun Micallef.

Series 1 ran for a total of 18 episodes, with the original production order extended due to the success of the show. A second series of 26 episodes began airing from 7 February 2010. Series 2 went on a planned hiatus as of Episode 10 on 18 April 2010. It returned with new episodes from 1 August 2010 and concluded with a Christmas special on 23 November 2010. Talkin' 'Bout Your Generation returned to its original timeslot of 7:30 pm Tuesday from 7 September 2010. A third series began on 8 February 2011 before concluding on 18 September 2011. The fourth series began on 1 February 2012 before concluding on 29 March 2012.
<onlyinclude>
A fifth series has been announced by the Nine Network to premiere 21 May 2018. A sixth series was premiered on 1 May 2019.

Series overview

Episodes

Season 1 (2009) 
The first series of Talkin' 'Bout Your Generation began airing on Network Ten on 5 May 2009. It ran for 18 episodes concluding with a Christmas special on 22 November 2009.

 Notes

a. From episode 12 onwards a small trophy with a plaque saying "Winner: Trivia Competition" replaced the different prizes that were awarded in each episode. A new trophy parodying the Raising the Flag on Iwo Jima was used starting from the first episode of the second season.

b. The season finale featured the contestants and the host dressed up in costume as people related to their generation era. Shaun dressed as Robert Smith, Amanda as Marilyn Monroe, Kerri-Anne as Krystle Carrington, Charlie as Marty McFly, Wil as "Doc" Emmett Brown, Josh Thomas as Gerard Way and Josh Lawson as Harry Potter.

c. This episode was a Christmas Special, with Christmas-themed questions. An extended version was aired on Christmas Eve, 24 December 2009.

Viewership

Season 2 (2010) 
The second series consists of 26 episodes and began airing on 7 February 2010 on Network Ten in Australia. The series was split into two blocks, both airing in 2010. The first ten episodes were broadcast until 18 April, and the second block consisting of a further 16 episodes aired from 1 August to 23 November. Additionally, a highlights special, dubbed Family Assortment, aired on 4 April 2010.

 Notes

a. The series 2 premiere featured a special 3D segment requiring anaglyphic glasses. Ten made the glasses available in copies of Woman's Day and TV Week magazines in the lead up to the broadcast.

b. Returning after a two-week break for the 2010 Commonwealth Games.

c. A Halloween themed special.

d. A Christmas themed special.

Season 3 (2011) 
On 14 September 2010, Network Ten confirmed Talkin' 'Bout Your Generation would return in 2011.  On 25 January 2011, it was announced that Series 3 would begin airing on 8 February 2011. Similar to series 2, this series was split into two airing blocks with a hiatus in the middle.

Season 4 (2012) 
On 27 October 2011, Network Ten confirmed Talkin' 'Bout Your Generation would return in 2012 for a fourth series. On 22 January 2012, it was announced that the show would begin airing on 1 February 2012 in an 8pm timeslot.

Season 5 (2018) 
The fifth series premiered on Nine Network on Monday, 21 May 2018 at 7:30pm. It is the first time that the show has aired on another network, following its cancellation from Network Ten in 2012.

In May 2017, it was rumoured the show may be revived on an unknown network but without the former host and panellists. In September 2017, it was confirmed the series would be returning, switching from Network Ten to the Nine Network, with Shaun Micallef to again host the series. Tickets for the audience became available at the end of September 2017 with filming for the series to take place between 7 and 29 October at Docklands Studios Melbourne. In October 2017, the series was officially confirmed for revival set to air in 2018, as well as the announcement of the series captains. Generation X will be led by Robyn Butler, Generation Y will be led by Andy Lee and Generation Z will be led by Laurence Boxhall.

The team captains for the 2018 series are Robyn Butler (Generation X), Andy Lee (Generation Y) and Laurence Boxhall (Generation Z).

Season 6 (2019) 

In October 2018, The series was renewed for a sixth season at Nine's upfronts with Micallef returning as host and Lee, Butler & Boxhall returning as series captains.  The series premiered on 1 May 2019.

Notes

References 

Lists of Australian non-fiction television series episodes
Talkin' 'Bout Your Generation